Tommi Tikka (born August 28, 1995) is a Finnish professional ice hockey player. He is currently playing for Ilves of the Finnish Liiga.

Tikka made his Liiga debut playing with Vaasan Sport during the 2015-16 Liiga season.

References

External links

1995 births
Living people
Finnish ice hockey forwards
HPK players
Ice hockey people from Helsinki
Ilves players
Kokkolan Hermes players
Peliitat Heinola players
Vaasan Sport players